Aarão Alves dos Santos (born 26 August 1974), known as Aarão Alves, is a Brazilian retired footballer who played as a left back, and is the current manager of Paulista.

Career
Born in Santos, São Paulo, Alves made his senior debut with Portuguesa Santista, but played professionally for a short period. He began his managerial career with Jabaquara's under-20 team in 2005. In 2007, he was in charge of the main squad for a brief period before being named manager of Paulista's under-20s.

Alves took over Paulista's main squad for the 2009 Copa Paulista, taking the club to the finals but eventually losing it to Fernando Diniz's Votoraty. On 19 February 2010, after only two wins in nine matches during the 2010 Campeonato Paulista, he was dismissed.

On 9 August 2013, after working for Jabaquara again, Alves joined Santos as an under-17 manager. On 20 January 2017, he was appointed at the helm of the under-20s.

Alves was dismissed by Peixe on 6 April 2018, after a poor performance in the year's Copa do Brasil Sub-20. He subsequently worked for Shandong Luneng before returning to his previous role in October 2020.

Personal life
Alves' father Manoel Maria was a footballer. A winger, he notably represented Santos during the later part of the Os Santásticos (1968–1973).

References

External links
Que Fim Levou profile 

1971 births
Living people
Sportspeople from Santos, São Paulo
Brazilian footballers
Association football defenders
Associação Atlética Portuguesa (Santos) players
Brazilian football managers
Paulista Futebol Clube managers
Santos FC non-playing staff
Brazilian expatriate football managers
Brazilian expatriate sportspeople in China
Expatriate football managers in China